Mongami is a place in the southwest of Babeldaob, the main island of the Micronesian republic of Palau. The village is the capital of the state of Aimeliik.

References

Populated places in Palau
Aimeliik